Too Rude is an American reggae rockband from Hermosa Beach, California, United States. Too Rude was created by the vocalist, Dogboy, and bass guitarist, Lazy Dread.

Biography
Too Rude was started by vocalist Robert Rogers and bassist Lazy Dread, along with guitarist Flan, and guitarist/back-up vocalist Fatal. Too Rude released their debut album, Too Rude July 4, 2000, on Suburban Noize Records. On October 26, 2004, the band released their second album Re-Invention, also on Suburban Noize Records. Robert "Dogboy" Rogers started up a solo career and released Rebel Riddim on Suburban Noize Records April 3, 2007.

Discography

References

External links
 

Suburban Noize Records artists
Musical groups from Los Angeles